Jessica Macaulay (born 10 November 1992) is a British and Canadian high diver.

She participated at the 2019 World Aquatics Championships, winning a medal.

She finished in second place overall in the 2019 Red Bull Cliff Diving World Series.

References

1992 births
Living people
Female high divers
British female divers
World Aquatics Championships medalists in high diving
Place of birth missing (living people)